Insight is the act or result of apprehending the inner nature of things or of seeing intuitively.

Insight may also refer to:

Film and television
 InSight (2011 film), an American mystery drama film
 Insight (2021 film), an American action film
 Insight (Australian TV program),  a current affairs talk programme, broadcast 1995-present
 Insight (American TV series), a religious syndicated program running in the US from 1960 to 1985
 Insights (TV series), a public affairs program based in Dallas, Texas, US
 Insight Communications, a cable television company in the Midwest U.S.
 Insight Sports, a media company in Canada that operates several specialty channels

Media and journalism
 Insight (Adventist magazine)
 Insight (Sunday Times), an investigation team for The Sunday Times newspaper
 Insights (FARMS), a  1981–2013 newsletter for the Foundation for Ancient Research and Mormon Studies
 InSight Crime, a non-profit journalism and consultancy organization on organized crime
 Insight Guides, a travel and map guide series based in the UK
 Insight on the News, an American conservative Internet magazine formerly owned by Sun Myung Moon's Unification Church

Music
 Insight (Prince Lasha album) (1966)
 Insight (Maciek Pysz album) (2013)
 Insights (album), a 1976 album by Toshiko Akiyoshi – Lew Tabackin Big Band
 "Insight", a 1980 song by Joy Division from Unknown Pleasures

Sports and recreation
 Insight Bowl, a college football bowl played in Tempe, Arizona
 Project Insight, a division of the San Francisco, California Recreation & Park Department that provides programs for young people with hearing or vision impairments

Technology
 InSight, a NASA spacecraft landed on Mars in 2018
 Insight (email client), a groupware email client
 Honda Insight, Honda's first mass production hybrid vehicle
 Norton Insight, a whitelisting technology present in Symantec's 2009 and 2010 range of antivirus software
 Insight Enterprises, a NASDAQ listed IT computer reseller based in Tempe, Arizona
 Insight Technology, a company that produces flashlights for mounting on weapons
 Hard X-ray Modulation Telescope or Insight, a Chinese X-ray space observatory

Other uses 
 Insight (public organization), a Ukrainian LGBTQI organization
 Institute for the Study and Integration of Graphical Heritage Techniques
 International Network for Strategic Initiatives in Global HIV Trials

See also
 Bodhi
 Insite, a supervised drug injection site in North America
 Vipassanā
 Wisdom in Buddhism or Prajna
 Incite (disambiguation)